The Communist Party, United States of America (Provisional) also known as the Communist Party, United States of America (Provisional Wing) or by shortened names such as the Provisional Communist Party, Provisional Party, Provisional Party of Communists, Order of Lenin or simply the Formation, is a communist political party in the United States founded by Gino Perente, a controversial farm labor organizer who died in 1995. The party includes much of the leadership of the National Labor Federation (NATLFED), and may have no further substance at all. Outside estimates cap membership at between 100 and 300 core members. Those alleged to be members make no public use of the name, and have virtually no identifiable offices or centers of operations.

The party, also referred to as the Formation, is clandestine and its exact origins and extent are obscure.  There are no party publications, no conventions or leadership elections. During Perente’s lifetime he exercised full control over the party, communicating directly with members through long orations held at his Carroll Street office in Brooklyn, New York, through audiotapes of those speeches sent out to members running the various NATLFED entities, or through rare printed manuals, such as Perente's 1973 mimeographed The Essential Organizer.

Party members do not openly acknowledge its existence. Members of the party are full-time volunteers in NATLFED entities.

Membership and history
Membership in the party is by invitation, and invitation comes to volunteers in NATLFED entities as a revelation of the existence of the party, an explanation of the party's goals and strategy, and a brief "history" of the party, called the "genesis."  This "genesis" is reportedly a narrative which includes claims that the party was part of a secret International including the Communist Party of Cuba, the Sandinistas and revolutionaries in Chile and El Salvador, and that members of the Weather Underground were among its founders.

In 2006 the CPUSA (PW) attained a small victory versus the state of California in Vega v. Mallory, when the State Legislature allocated $610,000 to settle the suit, which alleged that migrant laborers were overcharged for housing in a state-run program.  The Coalition of Concerned Legal Professionals and the Western Farmworkers Association, both NATLFED-linked groups, were instrumental in attaining a successful outcome for the plaintiffs.

In 2009 the party was reported to have been involved, again through some of its front groups, in a civic struggle around the proposed rebuilding of a hospital in a low-income area of San Francisco, USA.

Structure
The party's secrecy makes accurate appraisals of its internal structure and functioning difficult to achieve.  Testimony from former members and contacts has led various observers to characterize the CPUSA (PW) as a "political cult".  For example, party members are said to live communally and to spend all their time working for NATLFED entities.  The leadership reportedly maintains extensive file on members, and these accept limitations on contact with family members, while those who attempt to leave the group are said to be subjected to intense pressure and harassment.  Some observers, on the other hand, note that the NATLFED and associated groups do in fact perform real and valuable social service and grassroots political work. After Perente's death in 1995, leadership of the CPUSA (PW) was assumed by Margaret Ribar, who is reported to have relaxed some of those restrictions.

The party has a Central Committee and is divided into cells, referred to as "fractions", including a select "Military Fraction" which made news in 1996 after a raid on the party's New York headquarters resulted in the discovery of a weapons stockpile.  Most of its activities -and recruitment-, however, are carried out through front groups working in support of local community struggles.

Organizations reported to function as support structures or fronts for the CPUSA (PW) include:
 National Labor Federation
 Physicians Organizing Committee
 National Equal Justice Association
 Coalition of Concerned Medical Professionals
 Coalition of Concerned Legal Professionals
 California Homemakers Association
 Women's Press Collective (of New York; a distinct group from the Women's Press Collective of Oakland, California)
 Eastern Farm Workers Association
 Western Farm Workers Association
 Eastern Service Workers Association
 Western Service Workers Association

See also
National Labor Federation
Gino Perente

Notes

Communist parties in the United States
Marxist–Leninist parties in the United States
Clandestine groups
National Labor Federation